Windfall is a 1935 British drama film adapted by Jack Celestin and Randall Faye from the R. C. Sherriff play of the same title. The film was directed by Frederick Hayward and George King, and starred Edward Rigby and Marie Ault and George Carney. When an elderly ironworker receives a financial windfall, he uses the money to retire, but his family and those around him behave irresponsibly.

Cast
Edward Rigby as Sam Spooner
Marie Ault as Maggie Spooner
George Carney as Syd
Marjorie Corbett as Mary
Derrick De Marney as Tom Spooner
Googie Withers as Dodie
Charles Hawtrey as Minor Role (uncredited)

References

External links

1935 films
1935 drama films
British drama films
British black-and-white films
1930s English-language films
1930s British films